François Byssot de la Rivière (1612–1673) was an early figure in the New World, his presence being recorded at Île-aux-Ruaux in 1639 when the Jesuits took possession of the property.  He married Marie Couillard in Quebec on 25 October 1648.

Byssot was active in a number of pursuits and his name is associated with some of the earliest land grants and was also a person of note in seigneurial justice. In 1661, he received, from the Compagnie des Cent-Associés, a concession in what is now Labrador. He may have constructed a post at Mingan. He constructed the first tannery and was granted some other important concessions in both fishing and harvesting seals.

He had twelve children, two of whom, Jean-Baptiste and François-Joseph, attained some notability in Canadian history.

References 

 

1612 births
1673 deaths
Canadian explorers
French emigrants to pre-Confederation Quebec
People of New France
1639 in Canada
Immigrants to New France